Soochow University, also known as Suzhou University, is a public university in Suzhou (Soochow), China. Its root can be traced to the original Soochow University (東吳大學) founded by Methodists in 1900, which was later split and merged with a couple of institutions. It is part of the Double First Class University Plan held by the Ministry of Education for developing world-class universities. It only admits those who score at top 5% in the National College Entrance Examination of China, thus is regarded as a relatively selective university. The School of Humanities, School of Law, School of Textile and Clothing Engineering, School of Chemistry, Chemical Engineering and Materials Science, and School of Medicine are the university's most distinguished schools.

History 

The original Soochow University was founded by Methodists in Suzhou in 1900 as a merger of three existing institutions: the Po-hsi Academy, the Kung-hsiang Academy, and the Chung-hsi Academy by David Lawrence Anderson who became its first president. Originally known as the Central University of China, it was renamed the Soochow University in the Republich of China period. The word Soochow in its English name is the old spelling of the city's Chinese name according to the early postal romanisation. The original Chinese name 東吳 (Tung-wu) refers to one of the Three Kingdoms in the ancient time, of which the region of Suzhou was an important part.

The university was split in 1949 as a result of the Chinese Civil War, and merged with the Southern Jiangsu College of Culture and Education and the Department of Mathematics and Physics at Jiangnan University to form the Jiangsu Teacher's College in 1952. The English name Soochow University was revived in 1982; however, the original Chinese name 東吳 (Tung-wu) was not adopted, and the institution was given the Chinese name 蘇州 (Soochow). The Suzhou College of Sericulture, Suzhou Institute of Silk Textile Technology and Suzhou Medical College were each merged into the university in 1995, 1997 and 2000 successively.

Members of the Soochow Alumni Association who fled to Taiwan after 1949 established the Soochow University in Taipei, starting with its College of Law in 1951 and becoming a full-fledged university with five schools in 1971.

Academics

Accreditation and memberships 
The university is part of the national "211 Project" and is a "2011 Plan" university. It is also one of the Jiangsu provincial key comprehensive universities. Soochow University currently has 26 post-doctoral programs, 24 main discipline doctoral programs, including 167 doctoral programs with different areas of emphasis, one professional doctoral program, 47 main discipline master's programs, including 244 master's degrees with different areas of emphasis, 21 professional master's programs, and 124 undergraduate programs. Today, Soochow University has developed into a comprehensive university with 12 major disciplines: philosophy, economics, law, education, literature, history, science, engineering, agriculture, medicine, management science, and art.

Soochow University is one of the top 5% research universities (overall ranking 28 within 704 Chinese universities in 2017), and a member of the "2011 plan" - the latest program launched in 2011 by the Chinese Ministry of Education to develop into world class top universities.

Soochow University is a member of SAP University Alliances.

Rankings and reputation 

U.S. News & World Report ranked Soochow University 409th in the world, 21st in Greater China, and 58th in Asia. The Times Higher Education Word University Rankings ranked Soochow University 17th in China, and 501–600 in the world. CWUR World University Ranking 2018/2019 ranked Soochow University 361st worldwide and 24th nationwide.

Campus 
The university consists of 6 campuses covering an area of 135 hectares and with 940,000 square meters of building area. The main and most beautiful campus is located at No.1 Shizi Street. The total enrollment is more than 39,000 students, including more than 28,000 graduates/undergraduates and more than 11,000 adult students of formal education.

The campus grounds have been described as among China's most beautiful, in part based on the incorporation of "typical features of the classical gardens in Suzhou".

Schools and Departments 
School of Humanities
School of Communication - received financial support provided by Phoenix Television, Hong Kong until 2018.
School of Social Science
School of Politics and Public Administration
School of Education
School of Business
Kenneth Wang School of Law
School of Foreign Languages
Gold Mantis School of Architecture and Urban Environment
School of Mathematical Sciences
School of Physical Science and Technology & School of Energy
School of Chemistry, Chemical Engineering and Materials Science
School of Computer Science and Technology
School of Electronic Information
School of Mechanic and Electronic Engineering
School of Textile and Clothing Engineering
School of Arts
School of Music
School of Sports Science
Medical College - merged with the previously independent Suzhou Medical College in 2000.
School of Rail Transportation
School of Iron and Steel
Applied Technology College
Wenzheng College
School of Overseas Education

International collaboration 
The university has established several joint programs with foreign universities:
Soochow University and Athabasca University in Canada offer a joint degree program for Chinese undergraduate students, who study in Suzhou and are awarded a Bachelor of Management degree (from Athabasca) and a Bachelor of Administration degree (from Soochow) upon completing four years of coursework. All courses are delivered in English.
Daejin University, a South Korean private university, operates one of its two China campuses on the Soochow University grounds, with the other campus located at Harbin Normal University. Daejin maintains its own building with accommodation and classrooms.
Cornell Law School (United States) and Bucerius Law School (Germany) operate a Summer Law Institute in partnership with Soochow's Kenneth Wang School of Law.
Bard College, a private liberal arts college in New York in the United States, and Soochow University will offer a comprehensive partnership that will include a joint programme between Soochow University School of Music and Bard College Conservatory of Music, exploration leading to the creation of The Bard College Liberal Arts Academy at Soochow University, and student exchange.

Notable alumni 
The following people attended Soochow University after 1900, or one of the institutions that later merged with the university:
Sun Yang –  Swimmer, Olympic and world-record holder.
Jin Yong (Louis Cha Leung-yung, 金庸) - novelist and essayist, co-founder of the Hong Kong daily newspaper Ming Pao and its first editor-in-chief. 
Yang Jiang (Yang Chiang, 楊絳) - playwright, author and translator.
Tan Jiazhen (Tan Chia-Chen, 談家楨) - geneticist, founder of modern Chinese genetics; member of the Chinese Academy of Sciences, member of the National Academy of Sciences (NAS) of United States. 
Zhao Puchu (趙樸初) - religious and public leader, president of the Buddhist Association of China, renowned Chinese calligrapher.
Lu Zhiwei (Lu Chih-wei, 陸志韋) - psychologist and linguist, influential figure in Chinese modern poetry.
Chiang Wei-kuo (蔣緯國) - adopted son of Chiang Kai-shek, former Army general of Republic of China.
Wu Chenfu (胡經甫) - entomologist, founder of modern entomotaxonomy of China.
Ni Zhengyu (倪征燠) - jurist and the first Chinese judge of the International Court of Justice.
Tang Lan (唐蘭) - historian and paleographist.
Wu Chi-chang (吳其昌) - historian and paleographist.
Thomas Dao - Chinese American physician and specialist in breast cancer.
Nora Lam (Neng Yee-sung, 宋能爾) - Christian religious leader, Chinese Protestant Christian minister.
Li Haopei - international law academic and jurist
Ma Ke - fashion designer
Chen Yanqing - weightlifter, Olympic gold medalist.

References

External links 

 Home Page
 Home Page

Project 211
Universities in China with English-medium medical schools
Educational institutions established in 1900
 
Universities and colleges in Suzhou
1900 establishments in China